Bar Joseph (Italian: Bar Giuseppe) is a 2019 Italian drama film written and directed by Giulio Base. It stars Ivano Marescotti & Virginia Diop.

Synopsis 
Giuseppe is a man of few words. His silences need to be deciphered; his hands mean more to him than his mouth, and his work more than any words. Giuseppe has courage: he runs the risk of being the talk of the village and marries a refugee from afar.

Cast 
The actors participating in this film are:

 Ivano Marescotti as Giuseppe
 Michele Morrone as Luigi

Production 
The film was largely shot in Puglia, Bitonto, with scenes also in the territories between Terlizzi, Palo del Colle and Canosa di Puglia in the village of Loconia, up to Lavello in Basilicata. Filming took place between November and December 2018.

Release 
Due to the COVID-19 pandemic, a theatrical release could not be properly scheduled. The film was presented in 2019 at the Rome Film Fest, was distributed and made available by Rai Cinema exclusively on RaiPlay starting May 28, 2020.

References

External links 

 

2019 films
2019 drama films
Italian drama films
Films directed by Giulio Base
2010s Italian-language films
2010s Italian films
Films set in Italy
Films shot in Italy
Films about immigration to Italy
Films impacted by the COVID-19 pandemic